FOUP is an acronym for Front Opening Unified Pod or Front Opening Universal Pod.

It is a specialised plastic enclosure designed to hold silicon wafers securely and safely in a controlled environment, and to allow the wafers to be transferred between machines for processing or measurement. 
FOUPs began to appear along with the first 300mm wafer processing tools in the mid 1990s.  The size of the wafers and their comparative lack of rigidity meant that SMIF was not a viable technology.  FOUPs were designed with the constraints of 300mm in mind, with the removable cassette being replaced by fins in the FOUP which hold the wafers in place, and the bottom opening door being replaced by a front opening door to allow robot handling mechanisms to access the wafers directly from the FOUP.  The weight of a fully loaded 25 wafer FOUP at around 9 kilograms means that automated material handling systems are essential for all but the smallest of fabrication plants. Pitch for 300mm Foup is 10mm. While 13 slot pitch can be up to 19mm but only 13 wafers To allow this, each FOUP has various  coupling plates, pins and holes to allow the FOUP to be located on a load port, and to be manipulated by the AMHS (Automated Material Handling System).  FOUPs may also contain RF tags that allow them to be identified by readers on tools, in the AMHS etc. FOUPs are available in several colors, depending on the customer's wish.
FOUPs and IC manufacturing equipment can have a nitrogen atmosphere, in an effort to increase device yield.

FOSB

FOSB is an acronym for Front Opening Shipping Box, is used for transferring wafers between manufacturing facilities.

Manufacturers
 Entegris
 Marubeni
 Pozzetta
 Shin-Etsu Polymer
 Gudeng Precision
 Chung King Enterprise
 Danichi Shoji
 3S Korea
 ESun system technology
 Mirail

See also
SMIF

References

Semiconductor fabrication equipment
Semiconductor device fabrication

